Events from the year 2016 in San Marino.

Incumbents 
 Captains Regent: 
 Lorella Stefanelli, Nicola Renzi
 Massimo Andrea Ugolini, Gian Nicola Berti,  
 Marino Riccardi, Fabio Berardi

Events 
 15 May – Four referendums are held.
 5–21 August – San Marino at the 2016 Summer Olympics: 4 competitors in 2 sports. 
 20 November – Sammarinese general election, 2016.

Deaths 
 12 May – Giuseppe Maiani, politician, Captain Regent  (b. 1924).

See also 

 2016 in Europe
 City states

References 

 
Years of the 21st century in San Marino
San Marino
San Marino
2010s in San Marino